The second season of the American science fiction western television series Westworld (subtitled The Door) premiered on HBO on April 22, 2018,  and concluded on June 24, 2018, consisting of ten episodes.

The television series was created by Jonathan Nolan and Lisa Joy, and it is based on the 1973 film of the same name, written and directed by Michael Crichton. The second season stars an ensemble cast led by Evan Rachel Wood, Thandiwe Newton, Jeffrey Wright, James Marsden, Tessa Thompson, and Ed Harris.

The second season has received positive reviews from critics, with particular praise for the performances. However, it received criticism for its plot, which was said to be confusing.

Plot summary
After killing Dr. Ford at the end of season one, Dolores converts and leads the other hosts in killing many of the other guests in the few weeks that follow. She seeks to find a way to get out of the park to continue her revenge, and knows she must recover her father Peter's "pearl" to do so and unlock Westworld's true secrets with it. Charlotte Hale, who was attempting to smuggle Westworld data through Peter, also seeks the host as she cannot call for extraction without that data. Bernard still struggles with the fact he is a host, and comes to learn that Dr. Ford still has significant influence on him and the park. Maeve is aided by Lee and Hector to find her daughter, while learning there are many other parks to Westworld. The Man in Black is forced to come to terms with why he has spent so much time in the park when he encounters his daughter Emily Grace.

Cast and characters

Main

 Evan Rachel Wood as Dolores Abernathy
 Thandiwe Newton as Maeve Millay
 Jeffrey Wright as Bernard Lowe / Arnold Weber
 James Marsden as Theodore "Teddy" Flood
 Tessa Thompson as Charlotte Hale
 Fares Fares as Antoine Costa
 Luke Hemsworth as Ashley Stubbs
 Louis Herthum as Peter Abernathy
 Simon Quarterman as Lee Sizemore
 Talulah Riley as Angela
 Rodrigo Santoro as Hector Escaton
 Gustaf Skarsgård as Karl Strand
 Ed Harris as William  the Man in Black
 Ingrid Bolsø Berdal as Armistice
 Clifton Collins Jr. as Lawrence Gonzales
 Angela Sarafyan as Clementine Pennyfeather
 Katja Herbers as Emily Grace
 Shannon Woodward as Elsie Hughes
 Anthony Hopkins as Robert Ford
 Zahn McClarnon as Akecheta

Recurring

 Betty Gabriel as Maling
 Jasmyn Rae as Maeve's Daughter
 Jimmi Simpson as young William
 Ben Barnes as Logan Delos / The Forge
 Peter Mullan as James Delos
 Jonathan Tucker as Major Craddock
 Izabella Alvarez as Lawrence's Daughter / Robert Ford
 Patrick Cage as Phil
 Leonardo Nam as Felix Lutz
 Ptolemy Slocum as Sylvester
 Martin Sensmeier as Wanahton
 Tao Okamoto as Hanaryo
 Rebecca Henderson as Goldberg
 Aaron Fili as Roland

Guest

 Steven Ogg as Rebus
 Christopher May as Blaine Bellamy
 David Midthunder as Takoda
 Oliver Bell as Little Boy / Robert Ford
 Giancarlo Esposito as New El Lazo / Robert Ford
 Paul Riley Fox as young Robert Ford
 Neil Jackson as Nicholas
 Fredric Lehne as Colonel Brigham
 Tantoo Cardinal as Ehawee
 Currie Graham as Craig
 Lena Georgas as Lori
 Rinko Kikuchi as Akane
 Hiroyuki Sanada as Musashi
 Kiki Sukezane as Sakura
 Masayoshi Haneda as Tanaka
 Masaru Shinozuka as Shōgun
 Lili Simmons as New Clementine Pennyfeather
 Timothy V. Murphy as Coughlin
 Ronnie Gene Blevins as Engels
 Erica Luttrell as New Mother
 Sidse Babett Knudsen as Theresa Cullen
 Gina Torres as Lauren
 Paul-Mikél Williams as Charlie
 Julia Jones as Kohana
 Irene Bedard as Wichapi
 Booboo Stewart as Etu
 Sela Ward as Juliet
 Jack Conley as Monroe

Episodes

Production
The series received a second season renewal on November 14, 2016, with its debut occurring in 2018.

Casting began in 2017, with a bulk of the first season's core cast confirmed to return for the new season throughout the year. Talulah Riley and Louis Herthum, who appeared as Angela and Peter Abernathy, respectively, were upgraded to main cast status in March. On July 11, 2017, Katja Herbers, Neil Jackson and Jonathan Tucker were among the new cast members to be announced. Gustaf Skarsgård, Fares Fares, and Betty Gabriel joined in August. It was announced on September 15 that Hiroyuki Sanada was cast in a major recurring role. Zahn McClarnon was announced as being cast on November 3, along with the news he had been injured in an off-set incident, causing a brief pause in the season's filming. An alternate version of the show's Super Bowl LII trailer revealed Peter Mullan had been cast, playing James Delos. An additional trailer in March revealed Rinko Kikuchi was cast as well. The cast was rounded out a few weeks prior to the season's April 22 premiere with Tao Okamoto, Kiki Sukezane and Julia Jones.

Filming
Filming began in the summer of 2017, continuing to use the outdoor sets such as the Paramount Ranch and the Melody Ranch. Harris stated in an interview that, to ensure the production remain on schedule, scenes for episodes later in the season would be filmed simultaneously with earlier episodes. Actor Jeffrey Wright noted that many of Bernard's scenes with Anthony Hopkins' character, Dr. Ford, for late-season episodes were filmed first; in contrast to the first season where Wright had some idea of Bernard's arc, he had to make guesses as what the writers had planned out for Bernard in this season, and adjust his acting accordingly. As a result of the December 2017 Southern California wildfires, production was halted once again. 

Additional filming took place at the Frank Lloyd Wright-designed Millard House, which was used for Arnold's home in Shanghai, which at the time of filming had been on the market, making it easy to film in.

Music

Djawadi explained that he made use of seemingly-anachronistic cover versions is intended as "a subconscious reminder of the fact that this world is not real". Djawadi eventually came up with the idea of using a player piano to play modern songs, hoping to make an allusion to the hosts being machines "created to evoke human emotion", however showrunner Jonathan Nolan instead choose the songs that relate to the narrative, to allow Djawadi adapt them, without the composer necessarily knowing the details. Like the previous soundtrack, it is composed with several original songs alongside the covers of other popular songs. These songs feature Kanye West's "Runaway", Scott Joplin's "The Entertainer", The White Stripes "Seven Nation Army", Nirvana's "Heart-Shaped Box", The Rolling Stones "Paint It Black", and Wu-Tang Clan's "C.R.E.A.M.". The soundtrack was released on June 25, 2018.

Release

Broadcast
The season premiere debuted on April 16 at the Cinerama Dome in Hollywood, on April 18 at the 2018 Tribeca Film Festival and had many early screenings around the world prior to its April 22 airing. Showrunners Nolan and Joy revealed that certain episodes will be "super sized", running longer than the regular 60 minutes per episode from the previous season.

Marketing
During the 2017 San Diego Comic Con, an immersive experience was set up for attendees in addition to a panel held by the producers and cast of the series. The first trailer for the season was aired as well. A second, full-length trailer was aired during Super Bowl LII.

Reception

Critical response
The review aggregator website Rotten Tomatoes reported an 85% approval rating for the second season based on 470 reviews, with an average rating of 7.95/10; the average episode rating is 90%. The website's critical consensus reads, "Westworld builds on its experimental first season, diving deeper into the human side of AI without losing any of its stylish, bloody glory." Metacritic, which uses a weighted average, assigned a score of 76 out of 100 based on 29 critics, indicating "generally favorable reviews".

Critics received the first five episodes of the season as screeners before the first episode premiered. In a positive review for San Francisco Chronicle, David Wiegand wrote, "there is plenty of action and violence in the first half of the season, but what will empower the show's longevity is its metaphysical theme, the exploration of the meaning and definition of human existence." Rob Owen of the Pittsburgh Post-Gazette also praised the series, saying, "It takes a bit for Westworld to get back up to full steam, but by episode three (five hours were made available to TV critics), this futuristic, violent drama returns to fine form, introducing new parts of the park (Shogun World!), new characters and apparently new technology goals on the part of Delos, the corporation that owns Westworld." Journalist Lorraine Ali of the Los Angeles Times said, "It's poised to be a intellectually stimulating and emotionally bumpy ride, where the very concept of your existence becomes the stuff of high-brow entertainment and low-bar thrills."

The New York Times TV critic James Poniewozik quipped, "don't expect too much improvement too fast from Westworld 2.0. It's still overly focused on balletic blood baths and narrative fake-outs, and much of the dialogue still sounds as if it were written as a tagline for a subway poster, like Dolores's 'I have one last role to play: myself.' But Westworld remains a glorious production to look at, and there are stretches where it feels invigorated by its new, expanded world—freer to breathe, relax, invent." Ben Travers of IndieWire wrote, "all around, the actors remain strong, including a number of new cast members. Where season 2 stumbles is its structure and pacing. Episodes don't carve equal time for everyone; they focus on the two most connected stories and sometimes break for an entire hour without getting back to a series regular." After the release of the third episode, Forbes criticized the season for departing too far from the show's roots and instead trying to be an "action blockbuster", arguing in part that the violence was overdone in comparison to the first season.

Accolades
Westworld received six nominations and one win at the 70th Primetime Emmy Awards, nominations included Outstanding Drama Series, Ed Harris and Jeffrey Wright for Outstanding Lead Actor in a Drama Series, Evan Rachel Wood for Outstanding Lead Actress in a Drama Series, and Jimmi Simpson for Outstanding Guest Actor in a Drama Series. Thandiwe Newton won for Outstanding Supporting Actress in a Drama Series. For the 76th Golden Globe Awards, Newton was nominated for Best Supporting Actress – Series, Miniseries or Television Film.

Ratings

Notes

References

External links

 
 

2018 American television seasons
Westworld